The 2014–15 South African Premier Division season (known as the ABSA Premiership for sponsorship reasons) was the nineteenth season of the Premier Soccer League since its establishment in 1996.
Fixtures were announced 5 June 2014. The league opened on 8 August 2014 and will conclude on 9 May 2015.

Mamelodi Sundowns were the defending champions, having won the previous 2013–14 South African Premier Division (PSL) season. Chippa United earned their second promotion to the top-tier league after winning the 2013-14 National First Division. Polokwane City remained in the league after beating Black Leopards and Milano United in the Playoff Tournament.

Teams

Stadiums and locations

Football teams in South Africa tend to use multiple stadiums over the course of a season for their home games. The following table will only indicate the stadium used most often by the club for their home games

Personnel and kits

League table

Season statistics

Scoring

Top scorers

Clean sheets

Discipline

Player

Most yellow cards: 9
Luvhengo Mungomeni (Moroka Swallows)
Most red cards: 2
Vuyisile Ntombayithethi (University of Pretoria)
Siyabonga Ngubane (University of Pretoria)

Club

Most yellow cards: 20
Chippa United
Moroka Swallows
Most red cards: 2
University of Pretoria
Platinum Stars
Ajax Cape Town
Kaizer Chiefs
Free State Stars

Awards

Monthly awards

Source: Premier Soccer League

See also
 CAF 5 Year Ranking

References

External links
Official Website

Premier Soccer League seasons
1
South